Martin Schulz (born 17 March 1990) is a PTS5 class paratriathlete who had his debut in the sport in 2012. He represented Germany at the 2016 and 2020 Summer Paralympics in paratriathlon, winning gold medals in the men's PT4 & PTS5 events. He has a limb deficiency and a missing lower left arm.

References

External links
 
 
 

1990 births
Living people
German male triathletes
Paralympic medalists in paratriathlon
Paralympic gold medalists for Germany
Paratriathletes at the 2016 Summer Paralympics
Medalists at the 2016 Summer Paralympics
Medalists at the 2020 Summer Paralympics
People from Oschatz
Sportspeople from Saxony